Claudia Hernández Salas (born 19 January 1966), known as Claudia Hernández, is a Mexican former professional tennis player.

Biography

Tennis career
Hernández was the 16 and under Orange Bowl champion in 1982 and made the girls' singles quarter-finals of the 1983 US Open. As a Pan American Games competitor for Mexico she won two medals, both women's doubles bronze medals, in 1983 and 1987. Hernández, who played college tennis for the USC Trojans, represented Mexico at the 1988 Summer Olympics in Seoul, playing singles and doubles (with Xóchitl Escobedo). During her nine-year Federation Cup career she featured in a total of 22 ties for her country.

Personal life
Hernández is married Rafael Belmar Osuna, who is the nephew of US Open champion Rafael Osuna.

ITF finals

Singles (6–1)

Doubles (1–6)

Notes

References

External links
 
 
 

1966 births
Living people
Mexican female tennis players
Olympic tennis players of Mexico
Tennis players at the 1988 Summer Olympics
Tennis players at the 1983 Pan American Games
Tennis players at the 1987 Pan American Games
Pan American Games medalists in tennis
Pan American Games bronze medalists for Mexico
USC Trojans women's tennis players
Central American and Caribbean Games gold medalists for Mexico
Central American and Caribbean Games bronze medalists for Mexico
Central American and Caribbean Games medalists in tennis
Medalists at the 1983 Pan American Games
Medalists at the 1987 Pan American Games
20th-century Mexican women
21st-century Mexican women